The Star Two Door Sedan was manufactured by the Star division of Durant Motors.

Star Two Door Sedan specifications (1926 data)
 Color – Blue lacquer with nickel radiator
 Seating Capacity – Five
 Wheelbase – 102 inches
 Wheels – Wood
 Tires - 30” x 3-1/2” cord
 Service Brakes – Contracting on rear
 Emergency Brakes – Expanding on rear
 Engine  - Four cylinder, vertical, cast en block, 3-3/8 x 4-1/4 inches; head removable; valves in side; H.P. 18.2 N.A.C.C. rating
 Lubrication – Full force feed
 Crankshaft - Three bearing
 Radiator – Cellular type
 Cooling – Centrifugal water pump
 Ignition – Storage Battery
 Starting System – Two Unit
 Voltage – Six
 Wiring System – Single
 Gasoline System – Vacuum
 Clutch – Single plate dry disc
 Transmission – Selective sliding
 Gear Changes – 3 forward, 1 reverse
 Drive – Spiral bevel
 Springs – Semi-elliptic
 Rear Axle – Semi-floating
 Steering Gear – Worm and gear

Standard equipment
New car price included the following items:
 tools
 jack
 speedometer
 ammeter
 motor driven horn
 ignition theft lock
 demountable rims
 spare tire carrier

Closed cars have the following standard:
 sun visor
 rear vision mirror
 windshield wiper

Optional equipment
The following was available at an extra cost:
 none listed

Prices
New car prices were F.O.B. factory, plus Tax:
 Touring - $540
 Coupster - $625
 Coupé - $715
 Two Door Sedan - $750
 Four Door Sedan - $820

See also
 Star (automobile)

References
 

Durant Motors